Fyra is a 2012 album by Swedish jazz musician Magnus Lindgren. In 2012 he performed concerts with  Nils Landgren, Bohuslän Big Band, and Wermland Operas Orchestra in the project "Folk Notes, Tunes and Jazz", for which Lindgren arranged the music, conducted both orchestras, and performed as a soloist. Sweden's Orchestra Journal called the concert "Sweden's answer to Quincy Jones".

Track listing
 Park Avenue (Lindgren) 
 Fyra (Lindgren) 
 Visa från Rättvik (trad. arr: Magnus Lindgren) 
 Chinatown Run (Lindgren)
 Raval (Lindgren)
 Monday Afternoon (Lindgren)
 Istanbul (Lindgren)    
 Soho Blues (Lindgren)
 I Just Can't Stop Loving You (Michael Jackson)

Personnel
Magnus Lindgren – tenor sax, clarinet, flute
Anke Helfrich – piano 
Daniel Karlsson – piano 
Palle Danielsson – bass 
Jonas Holgersson – drums

References

External links 

2012 albums
Magnus Lindgren albums